Star Trek: 25th Anniversary may refer to:

 the 1991 celebration of the Star Trek franchise, which began with the 1966 TV series Star Trek (aka Star Trek: The Original Series)
 Star Trek: 25th Anniversary (computer game), a 1992 video game for the MS-DOS, Amiga and Macintosh
 Star Trek: 25th Anniversary (NES video game), a 1992 video game for the Nintendo Entertainment System
 Star Trek: 25th Anniversary (Game Boy video game), a 1992 video game for the Nintendo Game Boy